Patrick Kerwin  (October 25, 1889 – February 2, 1963) was the tenth Chief Justice of Canada.

Life and career 
Patrick Grandcourt Kerwin was born in Sarnia, Ontario to Patrick Kerwin and Ellen Gavin. Kerwin attended Osgoode Hall Law School in 1908. He articled in Sarnia with R. V. Le Sueur. In 1911 Kerwin moved to Guelph, where he practiced law for over 21 years with Guthrie and Guthrie, later changed to Guthrie and Kerwin. During that time, he served as solicitor for the city of Guelph and Wellington County, as well as Crown prosecutor. In 1932 he was appointed to the High Court of Ontario.

Supreme Court of Canada 
On July 20, 1935, Kerwin was appointed a puisne justice of the Supreme Court of Canada. In 1954, after 19 years on the court, Kerwin was appointed as Chief Justice, replacing the retired Thibaudeau Rinfret. Kerwin was considered an able judge and administrator. There was a minor controversy over him being Catholic, as Rinfret was also Catholic. Kerwin was deemed to be in poor health when appointed and there were rumours he would retire during his tenure but served 9 years. Five different associate judges were appointed to the court during those years, an unusually high number. 

Kerwin died on February 2, 1963, at the age of 73.

References

External links
 Supreme Court of Canada biography

Chief justices of Canada
Members of the King's Privy Council for Canada
People from Sarnia
Canadian people of Irish descent
1889 births
1963 deaths
Osgoode Hall Law School alumni
Canadian King's Counsel